Beijing possesses multiple ring roads.

1st Ring Road
When the city of Beijing had tram lines in operation from the 1920s to the 1950s, Line No. 4's route formed a ring-shaped loop, running 17-km clockwise through Tiananmen - Xidan - Xisi - Ping'anli - Dianmen - Gulou - Jiaodaokou - Beixinqiao - Dongsi - Dongdan - Tiananmen.  This route was known as the "Ring Road" (環形路).  After the tramlines were removed in the 1950s, this name lost its meaning as it was simply a collection of surface streets (in contrast, each of the other ring roads today is a single expressway). Plans in 1954 and 1957 show a different "1st Ring Road", a slightly larger rectangular loop between Beixinqiao - Ciqikou - Caishikou - Xinjiekou. Most maps in Beijing do not actually show the 1st Ring Road as such; only very few maps give a faint yellow highlight of a possible variant of it.  However, the original name remained to be used later for other ring roads constructed decades later.

The notion of "1st Ring Road" briefly reappeared after the end of the Cultural Revolution, during which the original names of the roads described above were changed to names with strong political propaganda meaning that eulogized and advocated the ideologies of the Cultural Revolution, and when the political turmoil had ended, the names changed.  One suggestion was to completely rename those roads as "1st Ring Road" to symbolize the new start in the era of reform, as well as to reflect the willingness of China to embrace modernness and globalization, but this suggestion was quickly turned down because most people favored the original names of the roads and believed in their historical meaning and cultural heritage, and more importantly, they felt that returning the original names also had more symbolic meaning of denouncing Cultural Revolution.  Therefore, the original names of the roads were adopted once again, and the phrase "1st Ring Road" was seldom heard again.

2nd Ring Road

Beijing's first (innermost) ring road, the 2nd Ring Road was built in the 1980s and expanded in the 1990s. It now forms a rectangular loop around central Beijing, an area that is roughly equivalent to the old city, which includes the four districts: Dongcheng District, Xicheng District, Xuanwu District and Chongwen District.  Its four sections begin at Xizhimen, Dongzhimen, Caihuying and Zuo'anmen.

The 2nd Ring Road passes through very central parts of Beijing, and runs almost directly past the Beijing North railway station and Beijing railway station. Prices of real estate inside the ring road are considerably higher than other parts of the city.

The 2nd Ring Road of today is part of an extended ring road which takes the southern route through Zuo'anmen and Caihuying instead of Qianmen Road, just south of Tian'anmen. Its southernmost part between Jianguomen and Fuxingmen appears "squashed" outwards. The 2nd ring is directly connected to the Airport Expressway and Badaling Expressway.

3rd Ring Road

The 3rd Ring Road was built in the 1980s and completed in the 1990s. It is by no means peripheral, as it passes through Beijing's Central business district and diplomatic communities (Dongzhimenwai / Liangmaqiao, Jianguomenwai). It is directly interlinked with numerous expressways—the Jingcheng Expressway, the Jingshi Expressway, the Jingkai Expressway, and the Jingjintang Expressway.

4th Ring Road

It connects the less central parts of Beijing and navigates through Zhongguancun technology hub, western Beijing, Fengtai District, and eastern Beijing. The Jingshen Expressway and the Jingtong Expressway (as of Dawangqiao) begin from the 4th Ring Road.

The 4th Ring Road, along with other ring roads, now have a few locations where "fake" police lights (red and blue in colour) light up at night. Drivers are easily fooled into thinking that the police is out in force. This indirectly forces drivers to slow down.

5th Ring Road

The 5th Ring Road is, along with the 6th Ring Road, a full expressway ring road. It is designated as a provincial expressway with number S50.

This ring road is further distant (around ) from central Beijing, and links the suburban areas of Huantie, Shigezhuang, Dingfuzhuang and Ciqu. It also passes through the Yizhuang Development Area. It navigates through very barren land in the south before heading west toward the Fragrant Hills.

Due to its proximity to Olympic venues, it has been nicknamed the "Olympic Avenue".
Also there is a comical Chinese song about the rings of Beijing. known as the Song of the 5th Ring Road.

6th Ring Road

At present the most remote ring road from central Beijing (around ), the 6th Ring Road was built in the 2000s and was completed in 2010.  of expressway between the interchanges with Badaling Expressway and Jingshi Expressway, running clockwise, are open to general motor traffic. It is the only ring road to be interlinked with the equally remote Jingha Expressway.

This toll expressway ring road links Beijing with Shunyi District, Tongzhou District, Changping District and Daxing District. It is included in the National Trunk Highway System and planned as a branch of G45 Daqing–Guangzhou Expressway, and henceforth receives the designation G4501.

7th Ring Road

The G95 Capital Area Loop Expressway, also unofficially known as the 7th Ring Road, is an orbital road of about 1,000 km that encircles the city centre of Beijing, mostly passing through Hebei. Only 38 kilometers passes through Beijing, another 38 km runs through Tianjin and 924 km is in Hebei province. Construction of the road was completed in June 2018 with the final section linking Beijing's outer districts of Tongzhou and Daxing.

Others 
China National Highway 112 is a ring road which runs around Beijing through province of Hebei and municipality of Tianjin, completely outside of Beijing municipality. Although not popularly known as part of Beijing's "ring road system", it has been informally identified as the "8th Ring Road" by some road-trip fans.

Inter-ring road connection routes

There also exist many connection routes between the ring roads. The ones listed below are all expressways or express routes. Travel on these routes is often surprisingly smooth, as there are no traffic lights on them.

11 routes are under construction as of 2004.

 Xueyuan Road (N. 4th Ring Road - N. 5th Ring Road, under projection)
 Badaling Expressway (as of N. 2nd Ring Road, expressway as of N. 3rd Ring Road, constructed)
 Jingcheng Expressway (as of N. 3rd Ring Road, partially constructed)
 Airport Expressway (as of N. 3rd Ring Road, portion connecting to N. 2nd Ring Road under construction as an express route)
 Yaojiayuan Road (E. 3rd Ring Road - N. 5th Ring Road, connecting to projected Jingping Expressway, under projection)
 Tonghui River North Road (E. 2nd Ring Road - E. 4th Ring Road, under construction as an express route)
 Jingshen Expressway (as of E. 4th Ring Road, portion connecting to E. 2nd Ring Road under construction)
 Jingjintang Expressway (as of E. 3rd Ring Road, constructed)
 Puhuangyu Road (as of S. 2nd Ring Road to S. 5th Ring Road, under construction/projection)
 Jingkai Expressway (as of S. 2nd Ring Road, expressway as of S. 3rd Ring Road, constructed)
 Fengbei Road (W. 2nd Ring Road - Jingshi Expressway (after Yuquan Road exit), under construction)
 Lianhuachi West Road (W. 3rd Ring Road - W. 6th Ring Road, opened October 15, 2005)
 Fushi Road (W. 3rd Ring Road - W. 5th Ring Road, under projection)
 Xizhimen Outer Street extension (W. 3rd Ring Road (Beijing) - W. 5th Ring Road, under construction/projection)

References  

 
Ring roads in China
Streets in Beijing